Paul Meier may refer to:
Paul Meier (athlete) (born 1971), German athlete
Paul Meier (statistician) (1924–2011), American statistician
Paul Meier (voice coach) (born 1947), British-American dialect and voice coach

See also
Paul L. Maier (born 1930), professor of Ancient History
PZ Myers (born 1957), American scientist and Associate Professor of Biology
Paul Meyer (disambiguation)